Zac & Mia is an Australian young adult novel written by A.J. Betts. The book was released on 24 July 2013.

Background
Betts started writing the novel in 2009 after working on a cancer ward in a children's hospital. Betts' main inspiration was a young woman named Tayla, who died suddenly. She later continued writing when Tayla's mother encouraged her to continue. Betts' main job previously was being an English teacher.

Plot
The novel follows seventeen-year-old Zac Meier as he undergoes treatment for non-Hodgkin lymphoma in Perth, Western Australia. He meets Mia, a fellow cancer patient in the adjacent room, and the two quickly form a connection.

Structure
The novel is divided into three sections, Zac, and, and Mia. Several critics have noted similarities between the book and The Fault in Our Stars.

Reception
The Australian praised the book, calling it "warm and uplifting". Australian Book Review praised the use of the book's three-part format. The Guardian also praised the format but criticised Mia's character. Hypable, in a positive review, labelled the book "much more than your standard YA cancer novel", and called the multiple perspectives of the narrative "beautifully written".

TV series 
The book was adapted into a web series by AwesomenessTV, which premiered on 7 November 2017 on go90. Anne Winters plays Mia, and Kian Lawley plays Zac. The series was renewed for a second season following a "strong fan response". The series was nominated for six Daytime Emmys in 2018, winning two including Outstanding Writing in a Digital Drama Series and Outstanding Lead Actress in a Digital Daytime Drama Series for Winters The second season was released on Hulu in February 2019.

References

2013 Australian novels
Australian young adult novels
Australian novels adapted into television shows
Text Publishing books